The Philippine House Special Committee on Peace, Reconciliation and Unity is a special committee of the Philippine House of Representatives.

Jurisdiction 
As prescribed by House Rules, the committee's jurisdiction includes the following:
 Cessation of hostilities generated by internal armed conflicts
 Negotiations and other policy and program initiatives in pursuit of the peace process and national reconciliation
 Welfare of rebel-returnees

Members, 18th Congress

See also 
 House of Representatives of the Philippines
 List of Philippine House of Representatives committees
 Civil conflict in the Philippines
 Office of the Presidential Adviser on the Peace Process

References

External links 
House of Representatives of the Philippines

Peace, Reconciliation and Unity